Mark Little (born 20 October 1959) is an Australian actor, television presenter, comedian and screen/stage writer. He is known for portraying the role of Joe Mangel from 1988-1991, 2005 and 2022 on the Australian soap opera Neighbours.

Career
Little appeared in a string of Australian films and TV series during the 1980s, including Short Changed (1986), written by Aboriginal playwright Bob Merritt and directed by George Ogilvie. He was nominated for Best Supporting Actor in the AFI Awards for this role. 

He also performed his own comedy in Melbourne's comedy clubs throughout the eighties, while his longest-running television role was as Joe Mangel in the soap opera Neighbours, from 1989 to 1991. Owing to the show's popularity in the UK, he became known in the country and subsequently moved to England. In 1990 he co-hosted with Tania Lacy on Countdown Revolution, a music show that was on ABC each week night. He and Lacy were fired from the show in June after their infamous protest about acts having to mime & the hosts having to "pretend" to like an artist, even if they didn't.

In 1994, he replaced Chris Evans as the presenter of The Big Breakfast. He has also narrated cult TV series The Villa on Sky TV.

He has worked on films such as Blackball and in the West End with his one-man show Defending the Caveman, which also won the Laurence Olivier Award in 2000. He returned to Neighbours as Joe for a brief period in 2005.

Little appeared as Roy in a production of Louis Nowra's play Così at The White Bear Theatre in Kennington, London, opening 29 July 2008. From the following year, he started making regular appearances on the discussion show, The Wright Stuff.

As well as extended runs of Defending the Caveman at London's Leicester Square Theatre, he toured the play around the UK in 2010.

In June 2010, he made his directorial debut starring in, designing and directing Jack Hibberd's A Stretch of the Imagination at The Cock Tavern Theatre in Kilburn, London.

Little has also written comedy films and poetry. He appeared in a documentary special celebrating Neighbours 30th anniversary titled Neighbours 30th: The Stars Reunite, which aired in Australia and the UK in March 2015.

In December 2017, Little played the character of "Fleshcreep" in a pantomime production of Jack and the Beanstalk at the Palace Theatre, Mansfield.

In 2019, Little took part in the eleventh series of Dancing on Ice, partnered with Brianne Delcourt.  They become the first couple to leave after the judges choose to save ex-cricketer Ryan Sidebottom and his skating partner Brandee Malto in the skate-off.

He has also taken many self-devised shows to the Edinburgh Festival Fringe and toured them nationally throughout the UK.

He is currently appearing in pantomime at the Middlesbrough Little Theatre in a Production of Peter Pan. He is playing the part of Captain Hook. UK.

In May 2022 it was announced he will reprise his role as Joe Mangel  for the ending of  Neighbours

Awards

1985 Australian Television Society Award, Best Actor for The Flying Doctors
1997 Paramount Comedy Award, Edinburgh Fringe for Psychobubble
2000 Olivier Award for Best Entertainment, Defending the Caveman
2008 Contributing Artist: Brighton Festival of Artists Open Houses, Best Open House: Cath Farr's The Art of Fun
Australian Film Institute: Nominations for Best Supporting Actor: 1985 "An Indecent Obsession" (Ben Maynard) and 1987 "Short Changed" (Curly)
Logie Awards: Nomination for Best Supporting Actor 1984 Waterfront (Alan)
Australian Television Society:  Nomination for Best Actor 1990 Neighbours (Joe Mangel)

Filmography

Skyways (1980) TV series
Cop Shop (1981) TV series
The Sullivans (1981) TV series
 Tennis Elbow (1982) as Sidney Tower
 The Clinic (1982), Basil
 Starstruck (1982) as Carl
 Infinity Limited (1984) as Rosco Waterfront (1984) TV miniseries as Allan
 Wills & Burke (1985) as John King
 An Indecent Obsession (1985) as Benedict Maynard
 The Dunera Boys (1985) (TV) a  Pete Dunstan
 The Flying Doctors (1985) TV miniseries as 'Roughneck' Ron
 The Flying Doctors (1986) TV series as Ron Miller (1986)
 Short Changed (1986) as Curly
 The Gillies Republic (1986) TV series
 A Matter of Convenience (1987) (TV) as Roger Purvis
 Evil Angels (A Cry in the Dark) (1988) as Constable Morris
 Bachelor Girl (1988) as Waiter
 Neighbours (1985) TV series as Joe Mangel (1988–1991, 2005, 2022)
 Nirvana Street Murder (1990) as Boady
 Golden Braid (1990) as Punk
 Greenkeeping (1992) as Lenny
 The Villa (1999) TV series as narrator (1999–2000)
 Distant Shadow (1999) as The Landlord
 The Rat Trap (1999)
 Motion (2001) as Foreman
 Summer Rain (2001) as Travel Agency Manager
 Blackball (2003) as Mark Doohan
 Casualty (2008) as Gary Forrester
 Emmerdale (2008) as Jonty DeLorean
 Whites (2010) as Darryl Sommers
 Neighbours 30th: The Stars Reunite (2015) as himself
 The Program (2015) as Rupert Guinness 
 Dancing on Ice'' (2019) as himself

References

External links
 

1959 births
Living people
Australian male comedians
Australian male soap opera actors
Male actors from Brisbane
Australian expatriates in the United Kingdom